Fedor V. Fomin  is a professor of Computer Science at the University of Bergen. He is known for his work in algorithms and  graph theory. He received his PhD in 1997 at St. Petersburg State University under Nikolai Nikolaevich Petrov.

Books

Fomin is the co-author of three books:

Awards and honours

With his co-authors Erik Demaine, Mohammad Hajiaghayi, and Dimitrios Thilikos, he received the 2015 European Association for Theoretical Computer Science Nerode Prize for his work on bidimensionality. Together with Fabrizio Grandoni and Dieter Kratsch, he  received the 2017 Nerode Prize for his work on Measure & Conquer.
In 2019 Fomin was named an EATCS Fellow for  "his fundamental contributions in the fields of parametrized complexity and exponential algorithms".
Fomin is elected member of the Norwegian Academy of Science and Letters, the Norwegian Academy of Technological Sciences, 
and the Academia Europaea.

References

External links
 
 
 

1968 births
Living people
Norwegian computer scientists
Russian computer scientists
Graph theorists
Academic staff of the University of Bergen
Members of the Norwegian Academy of Science and Letters